Bayswater Power Station is a bituminous (black) coal-powered thermal power station with four  Tokyo Shibaura Electric (Japan) steam driven turbo alternators for a combined capacity of .

Prior to September 2014 Bayswater Power Station was part of NSW Government power producer, Macquarie Generation. Macquarie Generation was acquired by AGL Energy in September 2014.

History
The first generator was completed in 1985, and the remaining three generators progressively that same year and throughout 1986.

Bayswater draws its cooling water from the Hunter River under water entitlements negotiated with the government of New South Wales. The Barnard River Scheme also allows Bayswater and Liddell to transfer water from the upper Manning River catchment into the Hunter River for their use. Much of the coal is supplied by overland conveyors from mines it shares with the nearby Liddell Power Station.

This is enough power for 2 million average Australian homes and families.

Greenhouse emissions
Carbon Monitoring for Action estimates this power station emits 19.80 million tonnes of greenhouse gases each year as a result of burning coal. In 2010 the Australian Government announced the introduction of a Carbon Pollution Reduction Scheme to help combat climate change. It is expected to impact on emissions from power stations.

In 2009, the power station was the subject of "the first ever legal action aimed at curbing greenhouse gas pollution from a coal-fired power station". Environmental activist Pete Gray went to the Land and Environment Court of New South Wales, asking it to find that the power station had been "wilfully or negligently disposing of waste [...] by emitting carbon dioxide into the atmosphere in a manner that has harmed or is likely to harm the environment in contravention of section 115(1) of the Protection of the Environment Operations Act 1997", and sought an injunction against the station. The case, Gray and Anor v Macquarie Generation, was ongoing at the time of Gray's death from cancer in April 2011.

Mid-life upgrade
In December 2018, a proposed upgrade to the Bayswater Power Station was approved to be completed around the same time as the proposed closure of the Liddell Power Station in 2022. Both are owned by AGL Energy and consume coal from the same mine. The upgrade approval did not impose tighter air emission controls, however AGL claimed that the closure of Liddell would result in a net improvement in air quality. The upgrade will increase the rated capacity of three turbines on the four generating units, increasing the capacity of each unit by 25MW whilst slightly decreasing the amount of coal consumed.

Plant information

Boilers
Steam pressure: 
Steam temperature: 
Height:

Turbo alternators
Number in use: 4
Manufacturer: Tokyo Shibaura Electric Company, (Toshiba) Limited, Japan.
Operating speed 3,000 rpm
Alternator voltage: 23 kV
Rating: 
Length: 
Weight:

Turbine house
Length: 
Height: 
Width:

Emission stacks
Height: 
Diameter at base: 
Diameter at top:

Cooling towers
Height: 
Diameter at base: 
Diameter at top:

Operations 
The generation table uses eljmkt nemlog to obtain generation values for each year. Records date back to 2011.

References

External links 

 Macquarie Generation page on Bayswater

Coal-fired power stations in New South Wales
Muswellbrook Shire
Main North railway line, New South Wales